Prachuap Khiri Khan is a town in western Thailand.  It is the capital of Prachuap Khiri Khan Province and is on the coast at one of the narrowest stretches in Thailand, only  from the border with Myanmar at Dan Sing Khon in the Tenasserim Hills. The area has large pineapple and coconut industries, in addition to being popular with Thai tourists. The town is 291 km south of Bangkok by road.

History
Prachuap Khiri Khan is home to a Royal Thai Air Force base, and was an invasion point for Japanese troops on 8 December 1941, during World War II. A commemoration is held each December to honour the 38 Thai airmen and civilians who died in the fighting against the Japanese 143rd Infantry Regiment in the Battle of Prachuap Khiri Khan.

Climate
Prachuap Khiri Khan has a tropical savanna climate (Köppen climate classification Aw). Seasons are not as distinct as in more northerly parts of Thailand; temperatures are quite similar throughout the year and the dry and wet seasons are not as clearly defined, with appreciable rain falling in all months.

Transportation

Prachuap Khiri Khan can be reached from Bangkok by train on the Southern Line from Bangkok railway station (Hua Lamphong).

The main road, which runs past the city from north to south, is Route 4 (Phetkasem Road). To the north, this road connects to Phetchaburi, Ratchaburi, Nakhon Pathom and Bangkok; to the south, it connects to Chumphon, Ranong, Phang Nga, Krabi, Trang, Phatthalung and the border with Malaysia near Sadao.

Prachuap Khiri Khan is served by Prachuap Airport, at the south end of town.

Industry
Australian company ASC and Thai company Silkline International formed a joint venture to build three Keka-class patrol boats for the Royal Thai Navy at Silkline's yard at Pak Nam Pran in Prachuap Khiri Khan.

Gallery

References

External links

Populated places in Prachuap Khiri Khan province
Myanmar–Thailand border crossings
Cities and towns in Thailand